Rachel Miskowiec is an American television producer who took over as executive producer of The Real in 2015. . She won two Emmys. She was named as executive producer of Dr. Drew's Lifechangers in 2011.  She was also named to produce Katie in 2013, replacing Michael Morrison.  She has been a producer of The Tyra Banks Show and Good Morning America.

Background
Miskowiec graduated with a B.A. in theater from Michigan State University in 1992.

References

External links

Year of birth missing (living people)
Living people
American television producers
American women television producers
Michigan State University alumni
21st-century American women